European Component Oriented Architecture (ECOA) is an open specification for a software framework for mission system software comprising components that are both real-time and service-oriented.

ECOA is managed by the French Direction générale de l'armement and the UK Ministry of Defence (through the Defence Science and Technology Laboratory - DSTL) with the help of the following industry partners:
 BAE Systems (Electronic Systems and Military Air & Information)
 Groupe Bull
 General Dynamics (UK branch)
 GE Aviation Systems
 Leonardo S.p.A.
 Dassault Aviation
 Thales Group (Air forces branch)

History
The initial study began in January 2008 with French partners, but work on the standard really began in January 2011. In August 2015, the first version of the standard was publishers as a UK Defense standard (DEFSTAN). In December 2015, the standard was republished as a BNAE standard. In July 2016, an updated specification has been made available.

Concepts
ECOA defines an architecture framework based on a Service-oriented architecture. ECOA Software Components (ASCs) are composed of modules which contain the application code and may run in parallel. ECOA provides mechanisms to make these software components portable across computing platforms through use of an interfacing layer called a container. Components  communicate with other components  using events, request–response and versioned data.

See also 
 Service-oriented architecture
 Allied Standards Avionics Architecture Council
 Integrated modular avionics

References

External links
 ECOA homepage
 ECOA standards
 ECOA overview on HIS2015

Aviation standards
Standards